The Fussball Club Basel 1893 1983–84 season was their 90th season since the club was founded. It was their 38th consecutive season in the top flight of Swiss football after they won promotion during the season 1945–46. They played their home games in the St. Jakob Stadium. Urs Gribi was their newly appointed chairman, he replaced Roland Rasi who stood down at the AGM after just one year chairmanship.

Overview

Pre-season
Ernst August Künnecke was appointed as Basel’s new first team manager and Emil Müller was appointed as his assistant. They had taken over from Rainer Ohlhauser, who had been manager for just the previous season. Künnecke had not played as professional footballer, but had played in the highest amateur levels before becoming professional head coach in Belgium. Künnecke's reputation grew because of his conveyance, his advancing and his greatest strength was the furtherance of young players. Waterschei Thor and KV Mechelen were two of Künnecke's stations in Belgium and that is the reason why Basel played two test games against these teams during the first half of the season.

A number of players left the squad. Hans Küng retired after having been with the club six years and playing in a total of 252 games, of which 154 in the Nationalliga A and 16 were in the European competitions (European Cup, UEFA Cup and Cup of the Alps). Peter Marti move to Aarau after having been with the club seven years, playing in 262 games of which 146 in the Nationalliga A and 29 in the European competitions. Serge Duvernois and Serge Gaisser moved on to play for FC Mulhouse. Further Bruno Graf moved to Wettingen, Winfried Berkemeier to FC Raron and Roger Bossert to local club FC Laufen. In the other direction a number of new players joined the club. Three came from Wettingen, goalkeeper Urs Suter and the two defenders Martin Andermatt and Rolf Lauper. Uwe Dreher joined from Stuttgarter Kickers and René Botteron from 1. FC Nürnberg. Two youngsters were brought in from local clubs, Thomas Süss from Nordstern Basel and Fredy Grossenbacher from Concordia Basel. Another youngster, Peter Nadig, advanced from Basel's own youth team. 

Künnecke coached Basel in a total of 58 games in their 1983–84 season. 30 matches were played in the domestic league, two in the Swiss Cup and 26 were friendly matches. Of their 26 test games, 17 ended with a victory, one was drawn and eight ended with a defeat. The team scored 88 goals in these test matches and conceded 42. Only two of these test games were played at home in St. Jakob Stadium, the pre-season match against Celtic and the end of season game against local team Nordstern Basel. The others games were all played away. Under these were the two games in the Uhrencup which Basel won, 3–2 against Grenchen in the semi-final and 1–0 against Zürich in the final.

Domestic league
The 1983–84 Nationalliga A was contested by 16 teams, including the top 14 clubs from the previous season and the two sides promoted from the second level 1982–83 Nationalliga B, these being La Chaux-de-Fonds and Chiasso. The league was contested in a double round robin format, with each club playing every other club twice, home and away. Two points were awarded for a win and one point given to each team for a draw. The champions would be qualified for 1984–85 European Cup and the next two teams in the league would be qualified for the 1984–85 UEFA Cup.

As the season advanced it became increasingly apparent that Künnecke's ideas were not reaching the entire team squad at all times. Basel's youngsters played well during this season, Fredy Grossenbacher, Martin Jeitziner, Peter Nadig, Thomas Hauser and Beat Sutter advanced well under Künnecke. But Künnecke's ideas were not being accepted by the older, experienced players. At home, in the St. Jakob Stadium the team was playing well and winning the games, the first five home games were all won. However, the first seven away games all ended with a defeat. After the winter break Basel lost their first home game against La Chaux-de-Fonds 0–1. Künnecke reacted immediately and this was the last game that the three veterans Arthur von Wartburg, Jörg Stohler and Jean-Pierre Maradan played in the team. The supporters had noted the differences and the final home game of the season attracted only 2,000 spectators. Basel ended the season in ninth position. In their 30 league games Basel won eleven matches, drew six and lost thirteen. Basel obtained 28 points, scored 55 and conceding 59 goals. They were 16 points behind Grasshopper Club and Servette both of whom finished level on 44 points. A play-off match was to decide the championship and this was who by the Grasshoppers who became champions for the second consecutive year. Bellinzona and Chiasso suffered relegation.

Swiss Cup
Basel entered into the Swiss Cup in the round of 64 and here they were drawn away against local lower league club FC Birsfelden. The match was a one-sided affair and Basel won 8–0. In the round of 32 they had a home fixture against Luzern but were beaten 0–3. Servette won the Cup beating Lausanne-Sport 1–0 in the final. As Cup winners Servette were qualified for the 1984–85 Cup Winners' Cup. Basel did not play in any other cup competitions because the Swiss League Cup was no longer competed and because they were not qualified for European competitions, nor did they enter the Coppa delle Alpi this season.

Players 
The following is the list of the Basel first team squad during the season 1983–84. The list includes players that were in the squad on the day that the Nationalliga A season started on 10 August 1983 but subsequently left the club after that date.

 
 

 
 

 

 
 
 
 
 

 

 
 

 

 
 

Players who left the squad

Results 
Legend

Friendly matches

Pre- and mid-season

Winter break and mid-season

Nationalliga A

League matches

League table

Championship play-off

Swiss Cup

See also
 History of FC Basel
 List of FC Basel players
 List of FC Basel seasons

References

Sources
 Rotblau: Jahrbuch Saison 2015/2016. Publisher: FC Basel Marketing AG. * Die ersten 125 Jahre. Publisher: Josef Zindel im Friedrich Reinhardt Verlag, Basel. 
 Die ersten 125 Jahre. Publisher: Josef Zindel im Friedrich Reinhardt Verlag, Basel. 
 FCB squad 1983–84 at fcb-archiv.ch
 Switzerland 1983–84 at RSSSF

External links
 FC Basel official site

FC Basel seasons
Basel